Lewis Pierce (born 16 November 1994) is an Australian rules footballer who played for the St Kilda Football Club in the Australian Football League (AFL). He played his first game in round 12 of the 2016 season against Carlton. He was delisted at the conclusion of the 2017 season but was redrafted by St Kilda in the rookie draft. He was again delisted at the end of the 2019 season.

References

External links 

 

1994 births
Living people
St Kilda Football Club players
Dandenong Stingrays players
Australian rules footballers from Victoria (Australia)
Sandringham Football Club players